Zeatupua is a monotypic genus of araneomorph spiders in the family Physoglenidae containing the single species, Zeatupua forsteri. It was first described by Fitzgerald & Sirvid in 2009, and is found in New Zealand. Originally placed with the Synotaxidae, it was moved to the Physoglenidae in 2017.

See also
 List of Physoglenidae species

References

Monotypic Araneomorphae genera
Physoglenidae
Spiders of New Zealand